Eckerd College Search and Rescue (EC-SAR) is a student volunteer maritime search and rescue team.  EC-SAR provides its services free of charge to the St. Petersburg / Tampa Bay area of Florida, from its station on the Eckerd College campus. EC-SAR works alongside local EMS services and the United States Coast Guard.  For emergency assistance EC-SAR can be contacted on VHF channels 16 and 68, phone number (727) 864-8256, or through Coast Guard Sector St. Petersburg.  Along with providing its services to the community, EC-SAR seeks to better the students by "Education through Service," building leadership and team skills.

History
In 1971 the team was created for the safety of the college's own vessels in the Waterfront Program. By 1977 EC-SAR expanded its services to the Tampa Bay area community. EC-SAR gained national attention in 1980 when it was one of the first agencies to respond to the Sunshine Skyway Bridge disaster.

EC-SAR was rated "Best Student Group" in Florida Leaders "Best of Florida Schools 2003" issue.

Members coordinate the utilization of four rescue boats through an operations/communications center located in the Waterfront Activities building. Students are rigorously trained in seamanship and handling boats, as well as a variety of rescue techniques. They are also trained to operate radios and correspond with other organizations such as the Coast Guard, the local police department and the fire department. EC-SAR responds to over 600 cases per year.

 Services 
Within their response range, including all of Tampa Bay and up to ten miles into the Gulf of Mexico from Longboat Pass to John's Pass, some services provided include:

 TowingUsing a variety of techniques, disabled vessels are towed to the place of nearest safe mooring.

 GroundersGrounded vessels are pulled off and towed to the nearest safe mooring.

 DewateringStopping the flow of water into a vessel and removing the water already in the vessel.

 ParbucklingRighting an overturned vessel.

 FirefightingPutting out fires that have started on boats, and occasionally towing burning boats away from populous areas.

 SearchingSearching for people or objects, including overdue vessels, overdue people and people who have jumped from the Sunshine Skyway Bridge.

 Medical AssistanceFirst responders stabilize injured patients and transport them to land where local EMS can meet them.

 Awards 
In 2015, the St. Petersburg Police Department awarded EC-SAR a grant for $8,000.

In 2019, EC-SAR received the Meritorious Public Service Award', the second-highest of the Coast Guard public Service Awards, from the United States Coast Guard.

References

External links
 Eckerd College Search and Rescue official Web site

Rescue agencies
Organizations based in Florida
Eckerd College
1971 establishments in Florida